Distell Group Limited, commonly referred to as Distell, is a multinational brewing and beverage company, based in South Africa.

Overview
Distell Group Limited is a producer and marketer of spirits, fine wines, ciders and ready-to-drinks. The group's headquarters are in Stellenbosch, South Africa.

As at February 2014, Distell had 5,300 employees worldwide and an annual turnover of ZAR 17.7 Billion.

History
Distell Group Limited traces its roots to two major alcoholic beverage companies in South Africa, Stellenbosch Farmers' Winery (SFW) and Distillers Corporation, that merged on 4 December 2000.

Merger

Stellenbosch Farmers' Winery 
Stellenbosch Farmers Winery Group (SFW) the founder member of Distell Group was formed in 1925 by William Charles Winshaw, an American medical doctor. As at the year 2000, SFW produced and distributed wine and spirits as well as non-alcoholic beverages through retail outlets South Africa and across the world.

In 1956 Stellenbosch Farmers Winery Ltd was listed on the Johannesburg Stock Exchange.

Distillers Corporation 
Distillers Corporation was formed in 1945 by Anton Rupert. Distillers expanded energetically and very quickly set up marketing relationships and partnerships in the wine and spirits industry. The company became a major producer, focusing on distillates and in particular on the brandy market that it developed from relative obscurity to its current level of prominence. It is renowned for its Bergkelder concept, a marketing innovation that invited wine estates to make use of Distillers' bottling, sales and marketing expertise. In addition, it created a new African icon, Amarula Cream, which is one of the top-selling cream liqueurs in the world.

Distillers Corporation was also listed on the JSE.

Merger transaction 
On 20 September 2000, Distillers' Corporation and Stellenbosch Farmers Winery directors announced the merger of the two firms. The merger was made possible because both firms had a similar shareholding structure i.e.
 Remgro-KWV Investments – 60% of  Distillers' Corporation and a similar stake in SFW.
 Other Beverages Industries (Pty) Ltd – 30% of  Distillers' Corporation and a similar stake in SFW. Other Beverage Interests Proprietary Limited is a wholly owned subsidiary of SABMiller.
 Public via The JSE – 10%
This structure allowed the merger not to have any diluting effect on the lead shareholders' effective interest in the merged entity.

On 4 December 2000, the management announced the conclusion of the merger. The newly formed entity was known as Distell from the names of the two constituent companies.

Distell Group's shares began trading on the Johannesburg Stock Exchange on 19 March 2001 under the symbol DST.

Post merger
In April 2013 Distell bought Scotch whisky company Burn Stewart Distillers from CL Financial for £160m.

Following its acquisition of SABMiller, Anheuser-Busch InBev announced that it would sell its 26.4% acquired state in Distell Group to Public Investment Corporation.

Announced acquisition 
On 15 November 2021, Heineken announced a plan to buy Distell Group, in order to become the market-leading alcoholic beverage supplier in South Africa. The takeovers would be the first major deal for Heineken’s CEO and chairman of the executive board Dolf van den Brink, who took charge at Heineken in June 2020.

Ownership
The stock of Distell Group Limited is listed on the JSE,  where it trades under the symbol: DST.  shareholding in the group's stock is as depicted in the table below:

 Remgro-Capevin Investments Proprietary Limited is a joint venture between Remgro Limited and Capevin Holdings. Each company has a 50% stake in the joint venture.
  Capevin Holdings is a JSE listed firm whose sole investment as at 30 June 2014 was an effective interest of 26.5% in the issued share capital of Distell Group Limited, held via its 50% interest in Remgro-Capevin Investments Proprietary Limited. 
 Remgro Limited holds 15.6% shareholding in Capevin Holdings. That gives Remgro Limited 30.65% indirect control in Distell Group Limited.

Brands 
Distell's major brands include:

Spirit portfolio

Wine portfolio

Cider and ready to drink

See also 

 William Charles Winshaw
 Stellenbosch Farmers' Winery v Distillers Corporation
 South African wine
 List of wineries in South Africa
 JSE Limited
 SABMiller

References

External links 
 Distell Group Limited

Food and drink companies established in 2000
Companies based in Stellenbosch
Companies listed on the Johannesburg Stock Exchange
South African winemakers
Beer in Africa
Multinational breweries
Drink companies of South Africa
South African brands
South African companies established in 2000